Gladiators: Australia vs Russia was the first and only Gladiators Challenge series between Australia and Russia. The filming took place, late in 1995, at the conclusion of the third Australian series, but predominantly featured contestants from the second Australian series.

The series was a team event, in which two challengers from each country competed together, changing which contestant competes in each event. There was only one team of Russian challengers, who competed in both heats.

Joe Lukowski broke the record on Hit & Run scoring 16 points. The previous record was 14 points, which he achieved in Australian series 2.

The series was aired in Australia in 1996 and was a tie with the Australian women and the Russian men winning respectively.

Contenders

Gladiators

Shows

Heat One
Challengers:  
Charity Crosby & Kathy McMorrow (Australia) Vs Elena Eirikh and Larissa Toutchinskaya (Russia).
Joe Lukowski & Shane Saltmarsh (Australia) Vs Vladimir Vassiliev and Yuri Volkov (Russia)

Eliminator

Female 5.5 second head start for Australia.
Kathy ran the eliminator in a time of 1.13. Elena ran the eliminator in a time of 1.45
Male: 5 second head start for Australia
Shane ran the eliminator in a time of 1.13. Vladimir ran the eliminator in a time of 1.31.

Winners: Women Australia & Men Australia

Heat Two
Challengers:  
Karen Trent & Sue-Ann Woodwiss (Australia) Vs Elena Eirikh and Larissa Toutchinskaya (Russia)
Wayne Neuendorf & Dimitri Moskovich (Australia) Vs Vladimir Vassiliev and Yuri Volkov (Russia)

Eliminator

Female 2 second head start for Russia
Karen ran the eliminator in a time of 1.41. Larissa ran the eliminator in a time of 1.22
Male: 0.5 second head start for Russia
Wayne ran the eliminator in a time of 1.16. Vladimir ran the eliminator in a time of 1.01.

Winners: Women Russia & Men Russia

Grand Final
Challengers:  
Charity Crosby & Kathy McMorrow (Australia) Vs Elena Eirika and Larissa Toutchinskaya (Russia) 
Joe Lukowski & Shane Saltmarsh (Australia) Vs Vladimir Vassiliev and Yuri Volkov (Russia)

Eliminator

Female 6.5 second head start for Australia
Charity ran the eliminator in a time of 1.17. Larissa ran the eliminator in a time of 1.40.
Male: 0.5 second head start for Australia
Joe ran the eliminator in a time of 1.24. Vladimir ran the eliminator in a time of 1.02.

Winners: Women Australia & Men Russia.

References

Gladiators (franchise)